Jakke Honkanen (born 22 May 1960) is a Finnish former rally co-driver, participating as co-driver in the World Rally Championship from 1989 to 2007. Past drivers include Toni Gardemeister (e.g. 2006 Monte Carlo Rally, 2007 Swedish Rally) and Jani Paasonen.

References

External links
Profile at ewrc-results.com

1960 births
Finnish rally co-drivers
Living people
World Rally Championship drivers
Place of birth missing (living people)
People from Nurmijärvi
World Rally Championship co-drivers
Sportspeople from Uusimaa